Eucalyptus tenuiramis, commonly known as the silver peppermint, is a species of small to medium-sized tree that is endemic to southeastern Tasmania. It has smooth bark, broadly lance-shaped adult leaves, flower buds in groups of nine to fifteen, white flowers and cup-shaped, hemispherical or conical fruit.

Description
It has smooth white to grey or yellowish bark. Flowering occurs from November to February and the flowers are white.

Taxonomy and naming
Eucalyptus tenuiramis was first formally described in 1856 by Friedrich Anton Wilhelm Miquel in the journal Nederlandsch Kruidkundig Archief. The specific epithet (tenuiramis) is from the Latin tenui- meaning "slender" or "thin" and ramus meaning "branch".

This eucalypt is reported as being an older form of its sister species, E. risdonii.

Distribution and habitat
Silver peppermint grows in open forest, often in pure stands, on lowlands and hills in south-eastern Tasmania especially in the Derwent River valley, but also on the Freycinet Peninsula and on Flinders Island.

References

External links
 E. tenuiramis at the NSW "plantnet" website

tenuiramis
Flora of Tasmania
Endemic flora of Tasmania
Myrtales of Australia
Trees of Australia
 Plants described in 1856